Uroptychus anatonus is a species of chirostylid squat lobster first found in Taiwan. U. anatonus and U. anacaena are similar but can be distinguished from each other by the shape of their 4th sternite and the length of their antennal scale. Both species resemble U. maori and U. brucei, but lack a ventral subterminal spine on their first pereopod's ischium.

References

Further reading
Baba, Keiji, et al. "Eumunida Smith, 1883."
Osawa, Masayuki, Chia-Wei Lin, and Tin-Yam Chan. "Additional records of Chirostylus and Munidopsis (Crustacea: Decapoda: Galatheoidea) from Taiwan." The Raffles Bulletin of Zoology, Supplement 19 (2008): 91–98.

External links

WORMS

Squat lobsters
Crustaceans described in 2008